SVO may refer to:
 Saturn Valley Online, an EarthBound MMORPG
 Sheremetyevo International Airport, one three major airports serving Moscow, Russia, IATA Airport Code
 Social value orientations, a psychological construct
 Sparse voxel octree, an algorithm for computer graphics rendering
 Special Vehicle Operations, a subsidiary of Ford Motor Company
 Mustang SVO, a car developed by Ford Motor Company
 Straight vegetable oil, vegetable oil used as fuel
 Subject–verb–object in linguistic typology
 Small Veblen ordinal, a large countable ordinal
 San Jose Chamber of Commerce, a chamber of commerce in San Jose, California, United States
 2022 Russian invasion of Ukraine, called  in official Russian texts